Gabriel Ramos (born September 14, 1994) is a Venezuelan motorcycle racer. He was born in Maracay, Venezuela.

Career statistics

Grand Prix motorcycle racing

By season

Races by year

References

External links
 Gabriel Ramos profile at MotoGP.com

1994 births
Living people
Sportspeople from Maracay
Venezuelan motorcycle racers
Moto3 World Championship riders
21st-century Venezuelan people